The list of shipwrecks in May 1821 includes ships sunk, wrecked or otherwise lost during May 1821.

1 May

2 May

7 May

8 May

9 May

10 May

13 May

16 May

17 May

18 May

20 May

21 May

24 May

25 May

26 May

27 May

28 May

30 May

31 May

Unknown date

References

1821-05